Félix Siby (January 18, 1942 – April 29, 2006) was a Gabonese politician. He was born in Setté Cama, Gabon and died in the capital, Libreville.

Life
Siby had a doctorate in applied economics from the Universite de Paris IX Dauphine. He began his career as a civil servant. In 1973 he became director of the cabinet of President Omar Bongo. Later the same year, he became secretary general to the Société Gabonaise de Raffinage (SOGARA), a post which he occupied until 1996.

Government posts
 Ministre de la marine marchande et de la pêche (Minister of merchant navy and fisheries), 1997–1999
 Ministre de la planification, de la programmation du développement et de l'aménagement du territoire (Minister of planning and development), 1999–2002.
 Ministre de la marine marchande, chargé des équipements portuaires (Minister of merchant navy), 2002–2004.
 Deputy of Ndogo in the province of Gamba, 2004.

References
 Translated from w:fr:Félix Siby, 3 May 2006.
 "Gabon : Décès de l'ancien ministre de la marine marchande Félix Siby" Gabonews, 29 April 2006. Retrieved 3 May 2006.

Members of the National Assembly of Gabon
1942 births
2006 deaths
University of Paris alumni
Government ministers of Gabon
Paris Dauphine University alumni
People from Ngounié Province
21st-century Gabonese people